

Results by parliamentary constituency
The results of the 2017 United Kingdom general election, by parliamentary constituency were as follows:

See also
 Results of the 2015 United Kingdom general election
 Results of the 2019 United Kingdom general election
 List of political parties in the United Kingdom
 List of United Kingdom by-elections (2010–present)
 Opinion polling for the 2017 United Kingdom general election

Notes

References

2017 United Kingdom general election
Results of United Kingdom general elections by parliamentary constituency